Olman Danery Maldonado Rubio (born 5 April 1966) is a Honduran lawyer and politician. He currently serves as deputy of the National Congress of Honduras representing the Liberal Party of Honduras for Comayagua.

References

1966 births
Living people
People from Comayagua
20th-century Honduran lawyers
Deputies of the National Congress of Honduras
Liberal Party of Honduras politicians